Pregradinka is a rural locality (a settlement) in Suvorovsky Selsoviet, Blagoveshchensky District, Altai Krai, Russia. The population was 336 as of 2013. It was founded in 1912. There are 3 streets.

Geography 
Pregradinka is located 21 km southeast of Blagoveshchenka (the district's administrative centre) by road. Suvorovka is the nearest rural locality.

References 

Rural localities in Blagoveshchensky District, Altai Krai